Paddy O'Hare was a journalist and Irish nationalist politician.

O'Hare became the editor of the Fermanagh Herald.  In 1945, he established a branch of the Irish Anti-Partition League in County Fermanagh.  He became a Nationalist Party member of the Senate of Northern Ireland in 1949, and remained a Senator until the proroguement of the Senate in 1972.  In 1965, he served as the party's Chief Whip.

References

Year of birth missing
Year of death missing
Members of the Senate of Northern Ireland 1949–1953
Members of the Senate of Northern Ireland 1953–1957
Members of the Senate of Northern Ireland 1957–1961
Members of the Senate of Northern Ireland 1961–1965
Members of the Senate of Northern Ireland 1965–1969
Members of the Senate of Northern Ireland 1969–1973
Nationalist Party (Ireland) members of the Senate of Northern Ireland
Journalists from Northern Ireland